George Nicol may refer to:

George Nicol (athlete) (1886–1967), British sprinter
George Nicol (bookseller) (1740?–1828), British publisher and bookseller
George Nicol (baseball) (1870–1924), Major League Baseball player
George Nicol (footballer) (1903–1968), Scottish footballer
George William Nicol (died 1876), African Colonial Secretary of Sierra Leone

See also
George Nichols (disambiguation)